The Worshipful Company of Coopers is one of the Livery Companies of the City of London. The organisation of coopers existed in 1422; the Company received its first Royal Charter of incorporation in 1501. The cooper trade involved the making of wine, beer, and spirit casks (a barrel is specifically a 36-gallon cask, or 32 in some circumstances); the Livery Company also functions as a charitable foundation, and supports two education establishments: the Coopers' Company and Coborn School of Upminster, Essex, and Strode's College of Egham, Surrey. The former was founded in the Ratcliffe area of London in 1536 and donated to the Company who have been involved with it ever since.

Their guild hall was first founded in the Bassishaw City ward in 1522, at The Swan tavern and from 1547 in a purpose-built livery hall. The hall was hired out for feasts by other companies and religious groups, and was used for drawings of government lotteries.
This hall was destroyed by the Great Fire of London in 1666 but subsequently rebuilt on the same site. The guild rebuilt again in 1865, selling a part of the site to the City of London Corporation for the expansion of Guildhall. This hall was destroyed by fire on the night of 29 December 1940. The livery then shared quarters with other Companies until purchasing their current headquarters in Devonshire Square, off Bishopsgate.

The Coopers' Company ranks 36th in the order of precedence of all the Livery Companies. Its motto is Love as Brethren.

List of Coopers as Lord Mayor of London 

 1742: Sir Robert Willimot - The first person to hold office from a minor company
 1777: Sir James Esdaile (mayor)
 1840: Thomas Johnson
 1855: Sir David Salomons
 1874: David Henry Stone
 1974: Sir Murray Fox
 2008: Ian Luder

References

External links
The Worshipful Company of Coopers

Coopers
1422 establishments in England